The 2020 Army Black Knights football team represented the United States Military Academy as an independent in the 2020 NCAA Division I FBS football season. The Black Knights were led by seventh-year head coach Jeff Monken and played their home games at Michie Stadium in West Point, New York

In a season impacted by the COVID-19 pandemic, the Black Knights compiled a 9–2 regular season record. They defeated the Midshipmen of Navy and the Air Force Falcons to secure Army's ninth Commander-in-Chief's Trophy, their third in four seasons.

On October 24, the Black Knights became the first team of the 2020 season to accept a bowl invitation, to the Independence Bowl. However, that bowl was canceled on December 20, due to a lack of available teams, leaving Army without a bowl game. Athletic director Mike Buddie said that "the team will continue to look for an opponent." On December 21, the Black Knights were named to the Liberty Bowl, after Tennessee had to withdraw due to positive COVID-19 testing within their program. Army went on to lose to West Virginia in the bowl, finishing the season with a 9–3 record. 

Following the completion of the season, the Black Knights were awarded the 2020 Lambert Trophy by the Eastern College Athletic Conference (ECAC) and Metropolitan New York Football Writers, signifying them as the best team in the East in Division I FBS. This was the ninth overall time the Lambert Trophy had been awarded to Army, and the second in three years (2018).

Previous season

The Black Knights finished the 2019 season with a record of 5–8, finished in third place for the Commander-in-Chief's Trophy following losses to Air Force and Navy, and missed out on a bowl for the first time since 2015.

Preseason

Offseason

Coaching changes
Following the completion of the 2019 season, reports surfaced that a staff shake-up was coming at Army. On December 20, reporter Pete Thamel of Yahoo Sports initially reported that John Loose would be moved out of the defensive coordinator position to assistant head coach and that wide receivers coach Marcus Edwards would not return to the staff. On December 21, former beat reporter Sal Interdonato, now with Black Knight Nation, confirmed Thamel's information and added that defensive line coach Kevin Lewis and outside linebackers coach Matt Hachmann, both of whom joined the Army staff for the 2019 season, would not be returning in 2020.

This was confirmed on January 2, when Nate Woody was announced by head coach Jeff Monken as Army's new defensive coordinator (DC). He had previously spent the 2019 season as a defensive analyst for Michigan, helping the Wolverines to edge out Army in double overtime. Prior to that he was the defensive coordinator under Monken-mentor Paul Johnson at Georgia Tech in 2018, the DC at Appalachian State from 2013-2017 during their transition into the FBS, and the DC at Wofford from 2000-2012, who were fellow SoCon members with Jeff Monken-coached Georgia Southern. Included in the news of Woody's hire was that former DC John Loose would be elevated to Assistant head coach in addition to serving as a position coach.

On January 8, Troy announced that they had hired away assistant strength and conditioning (S&C) coach Rusty Whitt to be the new head football S&C coach for the Trojans. Whitt had joined the Black Knights' staff for the 2019 season following nine seasons as the head S&C coach at Louisiana and Texas Tech.

On January 10, Keith Gaither was announced as the new wide receivers (WR) coach.  He had previously served as the WR coach at Army in 2015 and 2016 before moving on to be the passing game coordinator/WR coach at East Carolina. Gaither spent the 2017 and 2018 seasons at ECU before being let go with the rest of Scottie Montgomery's staff. He spent the 2019 season as the WR coach at Western Michigan.

On January 16, Sal Interdonato and Black Knight Nation reported that inside linebackers coach Kevin Corless, who had been on the Army staff since Monken's first year in 2014, would not be returning for the 2020 season. Additionally, he reported that Greg Gasparato was expected to join the defensive staff.  This was confirmed two days later on January 18 when Gasparato was officially announced as the newest Army defensive assistant coach, with his specific position duty to be announced at a later date. Gasparato previously spent the 2018-2019 seasons as the safeties coach for Appalachian State and the 2015-2017 seasons as the inside linebackers coach at Wofford.

On January 20, the West Point Athletic Department announced the retirement of quarterbacks (QB) coach Mitch Ware following a 35-year career, the past six of which were spent with the Black Knights. On the same day, Cody Worley was announced as the new QB coach for Army. Worley came to the Black Knights following six years (five seasons, 2015-2019) as the QB and B-backs coach for Kennesaw State during that program's creation and very rapid success at the FCS-level.

On January 24, two new assistant coaches were announced by head coach Jeff Monken: Shiel Wood as a defensive assistant and Saga Tuitele as the offensive line (OL) coach. Wood joined the staff after spending the 2019 season as the inside linebackers coach and special teams coordinator for Georgia State. Prior to that, he spent the 2018 season with Woody at Georgia Tech as the safeties coach and the previous eight seasons at Wofford in various capacities including a year as DC. Tuitele joined the Black Knights staff after spending the previous four seasons as the OL coach and run game coordinator for New Mexico. Prior to that he spent seven seasons with Cal Poly as the OL coach and offensive coordinator and the 2007 and 2008 seasons as the OL coach at Army.

On January 28, it was announced that offensive analyst Matt Drinkall would be promoted to tight ends (TE) coach, replacing Sean Saturnio who would be shifted back to special teams coordinator to cover for Mike Krysl's leaving to join Arkansas. With these announcements, all of the core assistant coach positions on staff were covered, with the only exception being the specific position group announcements for coaches Gasparato, Loose, and Wood.

On February 11, the team roster was updated to show the position responsibilities for the new defensive hires as well as some responsibility shifts. John Loose, formerly the DC, was put in charge of the outside linebackers (OLB). Greg Gasparato, one of the new hires, was put in charge of the safeties (S). Shiel Wood, another new hire, was put in charge of the inside linebackers (ILB). Finally, Josh Christian-Young, the previous year's safeties coach, was put in charge of the nickelbacks.

On March 19, it was announced that former Army assistant coach and player Mike Sullivan was hired as the new Director of recruiting. He spent a 17-year career as a coach in the NFL, serving as an offensive coordinator (New York Giants '16-'17, Tampa Bay Buccaneers '12-'13), assistant coach, and quality control analyst. Before that he served two stints as an assistant coach at Army, coaching the linebackers from 1995-1996 and the defensive backs from 1999-2000. He graduated from West Point in 1989 and played defensive back while at the academy.

On April 1, it was announced that Tenarius "Tank" Wright was hired as the new defensive line coach, coming to the Black Knights after spending two seasons as the Associate Director of Football Strength and Conditioning at Michigan. A 2012 graduate of Arkansas, where he played from 2008-2012, he was hired following the opening of an assistant coach position due to the departure of nickelbacks coach Josh Christian-Young to Tulane on March 3.

There were several other departures from the support staff during the first half of the year: Defensive Quality Control Analyst Rick Lyster left to serve as the outside linebackers coach at Fordham; Assistant Director of recruiting Operations Devon Doyle was hired by Coastal Carolina to serve as their Director of recruiting; and Jim Collins (Director of Player Personnel), Lawrence Scott (Director of Player Development), and Brett Moore (Director of On-Campus Recruiting) all stepped down from their positions. To replace these departures, several support staff were hired: John French was hired as the new Offensive Quality Control Analyst; Al Ades was hired as the new Defensive Quality Control Analyst; Brandon Reyes and Blair Vaughan were hired as new Assistant Strength and Conditioning coaches; Joe Manion was hired as the new Director of recruiting Operations; Greg Svarczkopf was hired as the new Director of On-Campus Recruiting; Rob De Los Santos was hired as the Director of Content Marketing/recruiting Assistant; and former player and 2013 graduate Raymond Maples was hired as the new Director of Player Development. Following these hires, Monken's 2020 staff changeover was completed.

Spring session and summer camp

The spring season, normally consisting of 14 practices and the Black and Gold Spring Game, was canceled on March 16 following the collective decision of the Patriot League presidents and superintendents to cancel all spring sports due to the Covid-19 pandemic. The Corps of Cadets did not return from spring break and completed the rest of their semester virtually from home, with only the firsties returning in June to attend graduation. In an interview, Coach Monken said the team was able to meet virtually with their assistant coaches to check on their mental well-being as well as go over "X's and O's."

The team returned to West Point in the latter half of June to attend the Summer Term Academic Program, complete required military training, and begin team summer workouts. The 77-strong plebe class (43 from USMAPS) reported for Reception Day from July 12–14. On August 6, padded practices for fall camp began and it was announced that firstie offensive lineman Mike Johnson, firstie fullback Sandon McCoy, and firstie linebacker Amadeo West were selected as the 2020 team captains. Camp broke for the beginning of the fall semester with a pair of intra-squad scrimmages in Michie Stadium on August 15.

Award watch lists

Listed in the order that they were released.

Personnel

Coaching staff

 Keith Gaither also served as the wide receivers coach at Army from 2015 to 2016
 Saga Tuitele also served as the offensive line coach at Army from 2007 to 2008.
 Tucker Waugh also served as the wide receivers coach at Army from 2000 to 2004.
 John Loose also served as the linebackers coach at Army from 1992 to 1999.
 Scott Swanson also served as an assistant strength & conditioning coach at Army from 1995 to 1996.
 Mike Sullivan also served at Army as the defensive backs coach from 1999 to 2000 and the linebackers coach from 1995 to 1996.

Source:

Roster

The Army football roster for the Week 1 game versus Middle Tennessee (as of August 30, 2020):

Depth chart

The Army football depth chart for the Week 16 game against Air Force (as of December 16, 2020):

Depth Chart 2020
True Freshman
Double Position : *

Schedule
Army had games scheduled against Bucknell, Buffalo, Eastern Michigan, Miami (OH), Oklahoma, Princeton, UConn, and UMass, which were canceled due to the COVID-19 pandemic. The game with Rice was postponed indefinitely due to the movement of the start of the Rice season to September 26 and was never rescheduled. A replacement schedule consisting of eleven games was announced on August 24, with the twelfth and final game against Cincinnati announced on August 26. The game with BYU, scheduled for September 19 as part of the replacement slate of games, was postponed indefinitely on September 12 with both the academy and BYU pledging to attempt to reschedule the game for a later date. On October 23, it was jointly announced by West Point athletic director Mike Buddie and Naval Academy athletic director Chet Gladchuk that the 121st Army-Navy Game would be moved from Lincoln Financial Field in Philadelphia to Michie Stadium at West Point due to "attendance limits placed on outdoor events in the state of Pennsylvania that would not allow the entire Corps of Cadets and Brigade of Midshipmen to attend." Because Army was to serve as the designated home team in 2020, Michie Stadium was selected to host. This will be the first time an Army-Navy Game will be held at a home site since World War II when the 1942 game was held in Annapolis and the 1943 game was held at West Point, both being Navy victories. The Air Force game, originally scheduled for November 7, was postponed indefinitely on November 5 with both schools saying they would reschedule the game if possible. On November 25, it was announced that the Air Force game would be rescheduled for December 19 between the Army–Navy Game and the Independence Bowl. As a result, the postponed BYU game was not rescheduled.

Rankings

Game summaries

Middle Tennessee

Louisiana–Monroe

BYU

at Cincinnati

Abilene Christian

The Citadel

at UTSA

Mercer

at Tulane

Georgia Southern

Navy

Air Force

vs. West Virginia – Liberty Bowl

References

Army
Army Black Knights football seasons
Lambert-Meadowlands Trophy seasons
Army Black Knights football